Alessandro Sommella (Napoli, Italy, 1956) is an Italian musician. He studied electric bass, guitar, violin and double bass.

He played in London with the band Souled Out producing  the album Shine On, and later formed the band Planet Funk with whom he won a gold disc for the album Non Zero Sumness. Since 2005 he has worked as a music producer with the poet Marcella Boccia, and a number of Italian and international singers, such as Jovanotti.

External links
Web site

Musicians from Naples
Italian musicians
1956 births
Living people